Youngman (officially China Youngman Automobile Group Co., Ltd.) was a Chinese manufacturer of buses and trucks located in Jinhua, Zhejiang province. The company was founded in 2001 by Pang Qingnian and also used to manufacture automobiles. However, its passenger car business appears to have ceased operation by mid-2015.

Name
"Youngman" is an English literalization of the name of the company's founder, Pang Qingnian.

History

Youngman was founded in 2001 by Pang Qingnian. In the early-2000s the company formed joint ventures with two German companies -  a bus manufacturing venture with Neoplan (at the time known as Gottlob Auwärter GmbH & Co. KG) and a truck manufacturing venture with MAN. After an increase of orders, the manufacturer has built plants in the cities of Jinan, Tai'an, Lianyungang, Quzhou and some other places to meet the high number of orders.

In September 2006 Youngman established a joint venture with the Iranian state-owned carmaker Iran Khodro for the manufacture of Iran Khodro's Samand and Soren models at Youngman's Tai'an plant, with parts supplied by PSA Peugeot Citroën.

Proton 
In November 2006, Youngman became the official Chinese importer for the British sports car maker Lotus Cars. In another joint-venture with the Lotus Group which was closed in December 2008, Youngman assembled Lotus and Europestar branded cars in Guangdong for the Domestic Chinese and export market. The units receive a Chinese independent brand to differentiate itself from the British sports car models. With the Lotus joint venture, Youngman is engaged in secondary activities as the exclusive importer of American automotive brand ZAP. Both brands had its China debut at the Beijing International Auto Show in 2009. In 2007, Youngman acquired the American electric car maker Detroit Electric (company), with the intention of manufacturing vehicles for the North American market.

In May 2008 it was reported that Youngman had signed two major agreements with the Malaysian carmaker Proton. The first was for the import of 30,000 Proton Gen-2 models from Malaysia to China over two years, to be sold under the Europestar marque as the RCR. The second was a licensing deal for Proton's Lotus-designed Campro engine, whereby Proton would sell 150,000 complete knock down units to Youngman over the subsequent six years.

In June 2010 Youngman had announced that it would be making an investment of CNY 4 billion in the construction of new manufacturing facilities in Haining, Zhejiang Province, for the production of passenger cars, alternative energy powertrain systems, vehicle bridges, transmissions and inner and exterior auto components. It is unclear what has happened to this manufacturing site since Youngman exited the passenger automobile business.

The Proton-Youngman joint venture contract expired in 2012, but Youngman continued to unofficially produce Proton's products up until early 2015. Between mid-2009 and February 2015, Youngman Lotus had reported total production figures of 196,234 rebadged CKD GEN-2 and Persona units, of which 189,872 were reportedly sold. However, by mid-2015, the China Passenger Car Association (CPCA) stopped reporting Youngman Lotus sales numbers because they were "way off" from registration numbers. Youngman Lotus had ceased production and sales altogether by mid-2015. In February 2015, Proton announced that they would revive their joint venture with Fujian-based Goldstar, and would not renew their contract with Youngman.

Saab 
On 28 October 2011 it was reported that Youngman and the Chinese automotive retailer Pang Da Automobile Trade Co had agreed a joint 100-million euro (US$140 million) takeover of the Swedish carmaker Saab Automobile and its United Kingdom dealer network unit from Swedish Automobile, with Youngman and Pang Da taking 60 and 40 percent stakes respectively.

Both Chinese companies pledged to invest 610 million euros ($844 million), prompting a court to extend the manufacturer's protection against creditors.

In December 2011 General Motors (GM) blocked the Chinese buy out, since GM has technology licenses in SAAB.

Saab's restructuring process was granted, and the plan was that in 2014 the company would have had a positive equity. The restructuring process would have removed 500 employees from Saab, saving about €100,000.00, according to the restructuring plan. General Motors rejected the deal with Youngman and Pang Da on 7 November 2011, although unsuccessful discussion to convince GM continued for a month. On 19 December 2011, chairman Victor Muller was forced to file Saab Automobile for bankruptcy following the failed buyout by a Chinese consortium, which was blocked by former parent GM to prevent technology transfer.

On 6 March 2012 an Indian news paper reported that at least two companies have placed bids for complete SAAB Automobile buy out. These are India's Mahindra and Mahindra and China's Youngman. It is reported that these bids are in the range $300 million to $400 million.

On 13 June 2012 it was announced that the National Electric Vehicle Sweden had bought Saab Automobile's bankruptcy estate.

Spyker joint ventures 
In August 2012, Youngman agreed to acquire 29.9% of the Dutch luxury sportscar maker Spyker N.V. for €6.7 million, and the companies agreed to form two new joint ventures. The Spyker P2P joint venture will focus on the development of a new luxury sports utility vehicle, with ownership split 75:25 between Youngman and Spyker respectively. The Spyker Phoenix joint venture will focus on the development of a range of premium cars based on Saab's Phoenix platform, with ownership split 80:20 between Youngman and Spyker respectively.

Products

Passenger cars
Youngman sold passenger cars in China under the Youngman-Lotus marque. Products included the L3 and L5 models, and are engineered with the assistance of the United Kingdom-based Lotus Engineering.

Products are listed as below:

Youngman Lotus L3 Hatch
Youngman Lotus L3 GT Hatch
Youngman Lotus L3 Sedan
Youngman Lotus L5 Sportback
Youngman Lotus L5 Sedan
Youngman Lotus T5

Coaches and trucks
Youngman produced coaches and trucks in collaboration with the German MAN Truck & Bus. Coaches are sold under the Youngman and Neoplan marques. Trucks are sold under the Youngman and MAN marques.

 JNP6120GR, JNP6120BEV1 and JNP6105GR - single deck buses based on Neoplan Centroliner platform
 JNP6120BEV1 - trolley buses based on Neoplan Centroliner
 JNP6250G - multi-articulate bus based on Neoplan Twinliner
 JNP6180GM - single articulate bus based on Neoplan Twinliner
 JNP6137S - double decker bus based on Neoplan Skyliner

Explanatory notes

References

External links
Official website

 
Companies based in Jinhua
Vehicle manufacturing companies established in 2001
Vehicle manufacturing companies disestablished in 2019
Chinese brands
Luxury motor vehicle manufacturers